The 2015 American Indoor Football season was the tenth season of American Indoor Football (AIF). The regular season began March 20, 2015, and ended on May 23, 2015. Each team will played an 8-game schedule, with the exception of the Maryland Eagles, who were scheduled to play a 4-game schedule, all on the road. The top 4 teams in the league advanced to the playoffs that began on May 30, 2015.

Pre-season
The 2015 offseason saw major change for the AIF, as the defending champion Baltimore Mariners and Cleveland Patriots both folded and the Rochester Raiders suspended operations. The Cape Fear Heroes left the league to join the X-League Indoor Football. The league had also announced the expansion of the Buffalo Lightning and the Carolina Silverhawks. The Silverhawks had planned on playing in 2015, but decided to plan for 2016 expansion. With only 3 teams remaining from the 2014 season, the AIF expanded on October 10 into Reading, Pennsylvania by taking in the previously independent ASI Panthers. Also joining later in the day on October 10, was the Saginaw Sting, from the Continental Indoor Football League. Just 5 days later, the Chicago Blitz, who had previous announced they would be joining the X-League, joined the AIF. Finally, on December 23, 2014, the Savannah Steam announced they were leaving the X-League to join the AIF.

Regular season

Playoffs

Awards

Individual season awards

1st Team All-AIF

2nd Team All-AIF

References